Paco de Lucía station completes extension of Line 9 of the Madrid Metro. It is located in fare Zone A and brings Metro to 50.000 new potential users. It opened on 25 March 2015, at the time making it station 301 of the Metro Madrid network. While the station's name was originally supposed to be Costa Brava, it is now named after Spanish musician and guitarist Paco de Lucía, a former resident of the district the station is located in, who died in 2014.

The new station also has a special feature that makes it unique in Spain with it being the first Metro station decorated with street art, specifically a great 300-square metre mural showing the face of the man it was named after. Street artists Okuda and Rosh333, with the cooperation of architect Antonyo Marest, under the supervision of Madrid Street Art Project, were responsible for creating the impressive work of art, which presides over the forecourt of the new station.

The homonymous station of Cercanías Madrid, built by Adif above the Metro station, was inaugurated on 5 February 2018. It allows connection with lines C-3, C-7 and C-8.

References 

Line 9 (Madrid Metro) stations
Railway stations in Spain opened in 2015